Gabrielle Bernard (1893–1963) was a Belgian poet writing in the Walloon language.

1893 births
1963 deaths
Belgian women poets
20th-century Belgian poets
20th-century Belgian women writers
Belgian writers in Walloon